Lorenzo Poli (born 23 January 1990) is an Italian professional footballer.

Biography
He made his professional debut in the 2008/09 season in Lega Pro Seconda Divisione for U.S. Vibonese Calcio. In January 2009 he was sold to Benevento in co-ownership deal and the club acquired him outright in June 2009. In summer 2009 he was loaned to Cassino and returned to Benevento in January 2010.

References

External links
 

1990 births
Living people
Italian footballers
U.S. Vibonese Calcio players
A.S.D. Cassino Calcio 1924 players
S.S. Villacidrese Calcio players
Association football defenders